The 1905 Wimbledon Championships was a tennis tournament that took place on the outdoor grass courts at the All England Lawn Tennis and Croquet Club in Wimbledon, London, United Kingdom. The tournament ran from 26 June until 8 July. It was the 29th staging of the Wimbledon Championships, and the first Grand Slam tennis event of 1905. May Sutton was the first overseas winner of a Wimbledon championship. There were 71 entries into the men's singles draw setting a new participation record for the event.

Finals

Men's singles

 Laurence Doherty defeated  Norman Brookes, 8–6, 6–2, 6–4

Women's singles

 May Sutton defeated  Dorothea Douglass, 6–3, 6–4

Men's doubles

 Laurence Doherty /  Reginald Doherty defeated  Frank Riseley /  Sydney Smith, 6–2, 6–4, 6–8, 6–3

References

External links
 Official Wimbledon Championships website

 
Wimbledon Championships
Wimbledon Championships
Wimbledon Championships
Wimbledon Championships